was a Japanese professional sumo wrestler from Fukushima, Hokkaidō. He was the sport's 41st yokozuna from 1951 until 1959. He is regarded as the first "modern" yokozuna in that he was promoted by the Japan Sumo Association itself and not the House of Yoshida Tsukasa. He was the first yokozuna from Hokkaidō, which was also the birthplace of the subsequent yokozuna Yoshibayama, Taihō, Kitanoumi and his own recruits Kitanofuji and Chiyonofuji. After his retirement he left the Dewanoumi group of stables and founded Kokonoe stable in 1967. He died in 1977 while still an active stablemaster.

Career
He was born , the fifth son of a squid fisherman. He joined Dewanoumi stable in January 1942. Chiyonoyama injured his knee in his first tournament, an injury that was to trouble him for the rest of his career. He reached the second highest jūryō division in November 1944 and made his debut in the top makuuchi division in November 1945. He had been an admirer of yokozuna Futabayama but his dream of facing him in competition ended after Futabayama announced his retirement during Chiyonoyama's makuuchi debut. In this first tournament he won all ten of his bouts but was denied the championship as in the absence of any playoff system in the event of a tie, it was simply awarded to the wrestler higher in rank (in this case, yokozuna Haguroyama).

In May 1949 Chiyonoyama defeated three yokozuna, finishing with a 12–3 record, and was promoted to ōzeki. He won two consecutive championships in October 1949 and January 1950 but was denied promotion to yokozuna as the Sumo Association felt he was rather young at twenty three and with his second championship being "only" a 12–3 they wanted to wait until they were sure he was ready. His October 1949 victory also coincided with the controversy over struggling yokozuna Maedayama being told to retire after being seen at a baseball game while he was supposed to be recuperating from illness. Chiyonoyama was eventually promoted in May 1951 after winning his third championship with a 14–1 record. He was the first yokozuna to be promoted without being awarded a licence by the house of Yoshida Tsukasa. During his yokozuna career he missed many bouts due to injury and in 1953 even asked to be demoted back to ōzeki so he could start over again. The Sumo Association refused this unprecedented request. Chiyonoyama finally took his first championship as a yokozuna in January 1955 with a playoff win over Tokitsuyama and won two more thereafter, in March 1955 and January 1957. Increasingly troubled by his knee injury to the point where he could sometimes barely walk due to the pain, he announced his retirement in January 1959.

Retirement from sumo
Chiyonoyama had expected to take over as head coach of Dewanoumi stable after the death of Dewanoumi Oyakata in 1960, but he was considered too young for the responsibility at 34, and he lost a succession battle to former maegashira Dewanohana. After yokozuna Sadanoyama married Dewanohana's daughter, Chiyonoyama realised he had no chance to take over and so asked to leave and set up his own stable. This was allowed on the condition that he also leave the Dewanoumi ichimon (group of stables). Previously the Dewanoumi camp had, since the days of Hitachiyama, always prevented ex-wrestlers from branching out. In March 1967 he set up Kokonoe stable, taking ōzeki (later yokozuna) Kitanofuji and nine other recruits with him. In 1970 future yokozuna Chiyonofuji, also from Fukushima, Hokkaidō, joined the stable. Chiyonoyama was unable to see Chiyonofuji reach the yokozuna rank as he died of liver cancer aged fifty one in 1977, but his widow attended Chiyonofuji's promotion ceremony in 1981.

Personal life
In September 1952 he married the daughter of an Osaka restaurant owner.

Fighting style
Early in his career Chiyonoyama was known for the power of his tsuppari (thrusting) attack but during his successful run to yokozuna in 1951 he made an effort to improve his yotsu-sumo (grappling) techniques under the supervision of ex-yokozuna Tochigiyama of Kasugano stable and his own head coach, former yokozuna Tsunenohana. He liked a migi-yotsu (left hand outside, right hand inside) grip on his opponent's mawashi and his favourite kimarite was uwatenage (overarm throw).

Career record

Through most of the 1940s, only two tournaments were held a year, and only one was held in 1946. The New Year tournament began and the Spring tournament returned to Osaka in 1953.

Modern top division record
Since the addition of the Kyushu tournament in 1957 and the Nagoya tournament in 1958, the yearly schedule has remained unchanged.

See also
Glossary of sumo terms
List of past sumo wrestlers
List of sumo tournament top division champions
List of sumo tournament top division runners-up
List of yokozuna

References

External links

Japan Sumo Association profile

1926 births
1977 deaths
Deaths from cancer in Japan
Deaths from liver cancer
Japanese sumo wrestlers
Sumo people from Hokkaido
Yokozuna
Kokonoe stable sumo wrestlers